Prolixibacter bellariivorans is a facultatively anaerobic, rod-shaped, non-spore-forming and psychrotolerant bacterium from the genus of Prolixibacter.

References

Bacteroidia
Bacteria described in 2007